Changwon Velodrome is a velodrome in Changwon, South Korea. It opened in 2000, and has a seating capacity of 14,000 spectators. The venue hosted the 2003 Asian Cycling Championships.

References

Velodromes in South Korea
Sports venues in Changwon